English hymnwriter Jane Eliza Leeson published several collections of original and translated hymns, including several for children. Her works include Infant Hymnings and Hymns and Scenes of Childhood, or A Sponsor's Gift.

Life 
Jane Elizabeth Leeson was born in Wilford, England in 1807 or 1808 and was christened on December 18, 1808, at St. Mary's Church in Nottingham. As an adult, Leeson converted to Roman Catholicism. She died in Leamington, Warwickshire on November 18, 1881.

Work 
Leeson was a prolific hymnwriter, publishing numerous collections of hymns during her lifetime. She also published translations of hymns from Latin, including a version of "Christ The Lord is Risen Today" by Wipo of Burgundy.

Collections 

 Infant Hymnings
 Hymns and Scenes of Childhood, or A Sponsor's Gift (1842)
 The Lady Ella: or, The Story of "Cinderella" in verse (1847)
 Paraphrases and Hymns for Congregational Singing (1853)

Original hymns 

 "Gracious Savior, gentle Shepherd"
 "Loving Shepherd of Thy Sheep"
 "Savior, teach me, day by day"
 "A little child may know"
 "Their hearts shall not be moved"

Translated hymns 

 "O Holy Spirit fount of love" (by Charles Coffin)
 "In the cross of Christ I glory, Towering o'er the wrecks of time" (by John Bowring)

References 

English hymnwriters
1808 births
People from Nottinghamshire
1881 deaths